Afrothismia baerae is a member of the genus Afrothismia. It is endemic to Kenya and is critically endangered due to loss of habitat.

References

Burmanniaceae
Taxa named by Martin Cheek